A deep state is a type of governance made up of potentially secret and unauthorized networks of power operating independently of a state's political leadership in pursuit of their own agenda and goals. In popular usage, the term carries overwhelmingly negative connotations. The range of possible uses of the term is similar to that for shadow government.
The expression state within a state is an older and similar concept. Historically, it designated a well-defined organization which seeks to function independently, whereas the deep state refers more to a hidden organization seeking to manipulate the public state.

Potential sources for deep state organization include rogue elements among organs of state, such as the armed forces or public authorities such as intelligence agencies, police, secret police, administrative agencies, and government bureaucracy. During the presidency of Donald Trump, deep-state rhetoric has been used in the United States to describe the "permanent government" of entrenched career bureaucrats or civil servants acting in accordance with the mandate of their agency and congressional statutes, when seen as in conflict with the incumbent presidential administration. The intent of a deep state can include continuity of the state itself, job security of civil servants, enhanced power and authority, and the pursuit of ideological or programmatic objectives. It can operate in opposition to the agenda of elected officials, by obstructing, resisting, and subverting their policies, conditions and directives.

Forms 
Deep state may refer to:
 Plans for an emergency government that takes over in the event of a disaster, see continuity of government
 A government run by:
 An unelected bureaucracy or branch of the security services – see section Cases
 A state within a state or deep state – specific examples include: Deep state in Turkey and Deep state in the United States.
 A 'shadow government', a conspiracy theory of a secret government.
 A broad definition of the state on the subject of state liability.

Etymology and historical usage 

The modern concept of a deep state is associated with Turkey, a presumed secret network of military officers and their civilian allies trying to preserve the secular order based on the ideas of Mustafa Kemal Atatürk from 1923. There are also opinions that the deep state in Turkey and "Counter-Guerrilla" was established in the Cold War era as a part of Gladio Organization to sway Turkey more into NATO against the threat of the expansion of Soviet communism. A similar concept is the Greek language κράτος ἐν κράτει, (kratos en kratei) that was later adopted into Latin as imperium in imperio or status in statu).

In the seventeenth and eighteenth centuries political debate surrounding the separation of church and state often revolved around the perception that if left unchecked the Church might turn into a kind of State within a State, an illegitimate encroachment of the State's civil power monopoly.

At the beginning of the 20th century, the deep state was also used to refer to government-owned corporations or private companies that seem to operate largely outside of regulatory or governmental control.

Scholarly understanding 

Within social science in general and political science specifically, scholars distinguish between positivism ("what is") and normativism ("what should be"). Because political science deals with topics which are inherently political and often controversial, this distinction between "what is" (positive) and "what should be" (normative) is critical because it allows diverse people with different preferred worlds to discuss the causes, workings, and effects of policies and social structures; while readers may disagree on the normative qualities of the deep state (i.e. whether it is good or bad), it is still possible to study the positive qualities (i.e. its origins and effects) without requiring a normative judgement.

In a 1955 article in the Bulletin of the Atomic Scientists, the realist international relations scholar Hans Morgenthau quoted others speaking about a "dual state" existing in the United States: the democratic façade of elected politicians who operate according to the law, and a hidden national security hierarchy and shadow government that operates to monitor and control the former. This has been said to be the origin of the notion of a deep state in the United States.

In the field of political science, the normative pop culture concept of the deep state is studied within the literature on the state. Current literature on the state generally traces a lineage to Bringing the State Back In (1985) and remains an active body of scholarly research as of 2020. Within this literature, the state is understood as both venue (a set of rules under which others act and interact) as well as actor (with its own agenda). An example of a non-conspiratorial version of the 'state as actor' from the empirical scholarly literature would be "doing truth to power" (as a play on speaking truth to power, which is what journalists often aspire to do) as studied by Todd La Porte. Under this dual understanding, the conspiratorial version of the deep state concept would be one version of the 'state as actor' while the non-conspiratorial version would be another version of the 'state as actor.'

The fundamental takeaway from the scholarly literature on the dual nature of the state is that the "state as actor" (deep state) is a functional characteristic of all states which has effects that may be normatively judged as "good" or "bad" in different times, places, and contexts. From a positivist scientific perspective, the state-as-venue, colloquially known as the "deep state", simply "is" and should not be assumed to be "bad" by default.

Intellectual history of concept 

While the state has been one of the longest-studied topics in political science, sociology, and economics, the rise of new institutionalism(s) in the 1970s brought to the forefront the dual nature of the state as both venue (a set of rules under which others act and interact) as well as actor (with its own agenda). This new institutionalism stands in contrast to the immediately prior behavioral revolution which focused on society-centered explanations for political outcomes where the state was primarily or solely seen as an arena where interest groups vied for political power.

State-as-actor versus state-as-venue 

The normative pop culture concept of the deep state is distinguished from the classical concept of the state within the scholarly literature on the state by the dual nature of the state as both an actor (which pursues certain ends) and a venue (which structures interaction between actors). In this dyad, the deep state is called the state-as-actor, while the classical concept of the state is called the state-as-venue.

State-as-venue 

To distinguish the traditional, formal processes of the state from the state-as-actor, the state-as-venue view reflects the state serving as an arena in which actors act. Under this concept, the state is seen as a passive organizational structure within which societal actors (e.g. interest groups, classes) compete for power, influence, and resources.

State-as-actor 

The state-as-actor concept subsumes the activities described by the pop culture concept of the deep state by focusing on all forms of state goal formation and pursuit which are independent of external societal actors (e.g. interest groups, classes).

Positivist political science and sociology further break this concept down into state autonomy and state capacity. State autonomy refers to a state's ability to pursue interests insulated from external social and economic influence. State capacity reflects the state's skills, knowledge, tools, equipment, and other resources needed to do their jobs competently. Together, autonomy and capacity are necessary for states to implement all policy including that delegated by political leaders, court decisions, and agency or ministry programmatic as well as the subversive or clandestine ends suggested by the popular usage of the deep-state concept.

Popular understanding 

After the 2016 United States presidential election, deep state became much more widely used as a pejorative term with an overwhelmingly negative definition by both the Donald Trump administration and conservative-leaning media outlets.

Deep state in public international law 
According to public international law (PIL), and the issue of state liability in particular, the term "deep state" is used to refer to the state in a broad sense. In this way, a state may need to answer for actions not only carried out by state authorities or representatives, but also other officials, regional authorities, publicly owned companies and other private bodies with state influence. This rule appears, among other things, in the ARSIWA report, produced by the International Law Commission, and in the case law of the International Court of Justice.

Cases

Chechnya 

According to the journalist Julia Ioffe, the Russian Republic of Chechnya, under leadership of Ramzan Kadyrov, had become a state within a state by 2015.

Egypt 

In 2013, author Abdul-Azim Ahmed wrote the deep state was being used to refer to Egyptian military/security networks, particularly the Supreme Council of the Armed Forces after the 2011 Egyptian revolution. They are "non-democratic leaders within a country" whose power is "independent of any political changes that take place". They are "often hidden beneath layers of bureaucracy" and may not be "in complete control at all times" but have "tangible control of key resources (whether human or financial)". He also wrote: "The 'deep state' is beginning to become short hand for the embedded anti-democratic power structures within a government, something very few democracies can claim to be free from."

Israel 

In May 2020, an article in Haaretz describes how people meeting Prime Minister Benjamin Netanyahu "have heard lengthy speeches ... that even though he has been elected repeatedly, in reality, the country is controlled by a 'deep state.'"

Italy 

The most famous case is Propaganda Due. Propaganda Due (better known as P2) was a Masonic lodge belonging to the Grand Orient of Italy (GOI). It was founded in 1877 with the name of Masonic Propaganda, in the period of its management by the entrepreneur Licio Gelli it assumed deviated forms with respect to the statutes of the Freemasonry and became subversive towards the Italian legal order. The P2 was suspended by the GOI on 26 July 1976; subsequently, the parliamentary commission of inquiry into the P2 Masonic lodge under the presidency of Minister Tina Anselmi concluded the P2 case by denouncing the lodge as a real "criminal organization" and "subversive". It was dissolved with a special law, the n. 17 of 25 January 1982.

Middle East 

Robert Worth argues deep state is "just as apt" for networks in many states in the Middle East where governments have colluded with smugglers and jihadis (Syria), jihadi veterans of the Soviet–Afghan War (Yemen), and other criminals working as irregular forces (Egypt and Algeria). In his book From Deep State to Islamic State, he describes a hard core of regimes in Syria, Egypt, and Yemen that staged successful counter-revolutions against the Arab Spring in those countries, comparing them with the Mamluks of Egypt and the Levant 1250–1517 in that they proclaim themselves servants of the putative rulers while actually ruling themselves.

Pakistan 

Since independence, the Pakistan armed forces have always had a huge influence in the country's politics. In addition to the decades of direct rule by the military government, the military also has many constraints on the power of the elected prime ministers, and also has been accused of being a deep state.

Soviet Union and post-Soviet Russia 

The Soviet secret police have been frequently described by historians as a "state within a state". According to the investigative journalist Yevgenia Albats, most KGB leaders, including Lavrenty Beria, Yuri Andropov, and Vladimir Kryuchkov, always competed for power with the Communist Party and manipulated communist leaders.

According to historian Abdurakhman Avtorkhanov in 1991, "It is not true that the Political Bureau of the Central Committee of the Communist Party is a supreme power. The Political Bureau is only a shadow of the real supreme power that stands behind the chair of every Bureau member ... The real power thinks, acts and dictates for all of us. The name of the power is NKVD–MVD–MGB. The Stalin regime is based not on the Soviets, Party ideals, the power of the Political Bureau or Stalin's personality, but on the organization and the techniques of the Soviet political police where Stalin plays the role of the first policeman." However, he also noted that "To say that NKVD is 'a state within the state' means to belittle the importance of the NKVD because this question allows two forces – a normal state and a supernormal NKVD – whereas the only force is Chekism".

According to former general Ion Mihai Pacepa in 2006, "In the Soviet Union, the KGB was a state within a state. Now former KGB officers are running the state. They have custody of the country's 6,000 nuclear weapons, entrusted to the KGB in the 1950s, and they now also manage the strategic oil industry renationalized by Putin. The KGB successor, rechristened FSB, still has the right to electronically monitor the population, control political groups, search homes and businesses, infiltrate the federal government, create its own front enterprises, investigate cases, and run its own prison system. The Soviet Union had one KGB officer for every 428 citizens. Putin's Russia has one FSB-ist for every 297 citizens."

Turkey 

According to the Journalist Robert F. Worth, "The expression 'deep state' had originated in Turkey in the 1990s, where the military colluded with drug traffickers and hit men to wage a dirty war against Kurdish insurgents". Professor Ryan Gingeras wrote that the Turkish term derin devlet "colloquially speaking" refers to "'criminal' or 'rogue' element that have somehow muscled their way into power". The journalist Dexter Filkins wrote of a "presumed clandestine network" of Turkish "military officers and their civilian allies" who, for decades, "suppressed and sometimes murdered dissidents, Communists, reporters, Islamists, Christian missionaries, and members of minority groups—anyone thought to pose a threat to the secular order". Journalist Hugh Roberts has described the "shady nexus" between the police and intelligence services, "certain politicians and organised crime", whose members believe they are authorised "to get up to all sorts of unavowable things" because they are "custodians of the higher interests of the nation".

United Kingdom 

The Civil Service has been called a deep state by senior politicians. Tony Blair said: "You cannot underestimate how much they believe it's their job to actually run the country and to resist the changes put forward by people they dismiss as 'here today, gone tomorrow' politicians. They genuinely see themselves as the true guardians of the national interest, and think that their job is simply to wear you down and wait you out." The efforts of the Civil Service to frustrate elected politicians is the subject of the popular satirical BBC TV comedy Yes Minister, which originated in the 1980s.

United States 

Since at least 2013, the deep state conspiracy theory has been used to describe "a hybrid association of government elements and parts of top-level industry and finance that is effectively able to govern the United States without reference to the consent of the governed as expressed through the formal political process." Intelligence agencies such as the CIA have been accused by elements of the Donald Trump administration of attempting to thwart its policy goals. Writing for The New York Times, the analyst Issandr El Amani warned against the "growing discord between a president and his bureaucratic rank-and-file", while analysts of the column The Interpreter wrote:

According to the political commentator David Gergen, quoted by Time in early 2017, the term has been appropriated by Steve Bannon and Breitbart News, and other supporters of the Trump Administration in order to delegitimize critics of the Trump presidency. In February 2017, deep-state theory was dismissed by authors for The New York Times, as well as The New York Observer. In October 2019 The New York Times gave credence to the general idea by publishing an opinion piece arguing that the deep state in the civil service was created to "battle people like Trump".

Scholars have generally disputed the notion that the U.S. executive branch bureaucracy represents a true deep state as the term is formally understood but have taken a range of views on the role of that bureaucracy in constraining or empowering the U.S. president.

Venezuela 

The Cartel of the Suns, a group of high-ranking officials within the Bolivarian Government of Venezuela, has been described as "a series of often competing networks buried deep within the Chavista regime". Following the Bolivarian Revolution, the Bolivarian government initially embezzled until there were no more funds to embezzle, which required them to turn to drug trafficking. President Hugo Chávez made partnerships with the Colombian leftist militia Revolutionary Armed Forces of Colombia (FARC) and his successor Nicolás Maduro continued the process, promoting officials to high-ranking positions after they were accused of drug trafficking.

Other alleged cases 

 Imperial Japan's Army, Kwantung Army and the post-war ninkyō dantai
 Imperial Brazil's Diretório Monárquico do Brasil
 India's RSS
 Indonesia's Kopassus
 Iran's IRGC
 Morocco's Makhzen
 Pakistan's Intelligence Community: ISI, FIA, NAB, and/or IB
 Serbia's Black Hand
 Serbia and Montenegro's RDB
 Spain's Grupos Antiterroristas de Liberación, "Antiterrorist Liberation Groups"
 Thailand's Military-Monarchy Nexus or Network monarchy
 United Kingdom's City of London Corporation

See also 

 Cabal
 Counterintelligence state
 Dual power
 Fifth column
 Fourth branch of government
 Illiberal democracy
 Military coup
 Military dictatorship
 Military–industrial complex
 Parallel state
 Political machine
 Power behind the throne
 Proto-state
 Puppet government
 Shadow government (conspiracy)
 Smoke-filled room

References 

Authoritarianism
Corruption
Deep politics
Dictatorship
Political geography
Calques
Conspiracy theories